Justice for All may refer to:

Justice for All (game show), a Hong Kong game show
"Justice for All" (song), a song by Donald Trump
Justice for All with Judge Cristina Perez,  an American dramatized court show that debuted in 2012
"Justice for All" (TV pilot), a 1968 television pilot and predecessor to All in the Family
Justice for All Party, a political party in Guyana
Justice for All, a 2018 film by Hector Echavarria
Justice for All, the original name of the Man's Rights in the Family Party in Israel
Justice for All!, a 1963 album by British singer Jimmy Justice
Phoenix Wright: Ace Attorney − Justice for All, a 2002 video game

See also
...And Justice for All (disambiguation)